This is a list of the most populous urban areas in Hungary, based on official data of the Hungarian Central Statistical Office (KSH) and the Organisation for Economic Co-operation and Development (OECD).

Methodology
The functional urban areas identified with the methodology described in the book Redefining “urban”: A new way to measure metropolitan areas (OECD Publishing, 2012) are here listed by size, according to four different classes:
 Small urban areas (population between 50,000 and 200,000)
 Medium-sized urban areas (population between 200,000 and 500,000)
 Metropolitan areas (population between 500,000 and 1.5 million)
 Large metropolitan areas (population above 1.5 million)

List of most populous urban areas

See also
 List of cities and towns of Hungary
 Regions of Hungary
 Counties of Hungary

References

External links

Hungary
Demographics of Hungary
Hungary
 
Urban areas